The Huqooq-e-Sindh March was a 2022 protest march against the provincial Sindh Government of Sindh, Pakistan. Inaugurated by PTI Vice Chairman Shah Mehmood Qureshi, the march started on February 26 at the Shaheed commune in Ghotki near the Sindh–Punjab border, and ended on March 6 in Karachi.

March route and timeline
The route of the march was scheduled to incorporate 27 districts of the Sindh province, ending in Karachi on March 6.
 February 27 – The march set off from Ghotki, then headed for Sukkur and reached Shikarpur, Kashmore and Jacobabad.
 February 28 – The march passed through Qambar Shahdadkot District and Larkana.
 March 1 – The protesters encamped in Khairpur, Naushahro Feroze and Nawabshah.
 Addressing a press conference in Larkana, FM Shah Mahmood Qureshi said that we have excluded Nowshero Feroz, Halani and Kandiaro from the route of the march to avoid the expected clash and violence with the PPP workers.
 March 2 – The next destinations of the march were Sanghar and Mirpur Khas.
 March 3 – Arrival at Umerkot, Tharparker district and Badin, with overnight stay.
 March 4 – Passed through Tando Jan Mohammad, Tando Allahyar and Matiari.
 March 5 – Reached next destination Hyderabad.
 March 6 – March entered its final phase and returned to Karachi from Jamshoro.
At the conclusion of the march, speeches were made by central PTI leaders in front of a large gathered crowd, and a charter of demands for the PPP was read out by PTI Sindh president, Ali Haider Zaidi.

See also
 PPP long march

References

2022 in Pakistan
2022 protests
Protests in Pakistan
February 2022 events in Pakistan
Imran Khan administration
March 2022 events in Pakistan
Protest marches
Pakistan Tehreek-e-Insaf
2022 in Pakistani politics
Politics of Pakistan